Wacław Waldemar Michalski (born 27 September 1938 in Volodymyr-Volynskyi) is a Polish poet, librarian, editor, curator and critic.

Biography 
Waldemar Michalski studied Polish Philology at the John Paul II Catholic University of Lublin, which he finished in 1963 with the Magister. At the same time he became a member of the literary group "Prom", later, along with Wacław Oszajca, also the group "Signum". His prose debut was in "Tygodnik Społeczno-Kulturalny Katolików" with a report on Polish people in Lviv ("Polacy ziemi lwowskiej"), as a poet in 1960 in the almanac "Biuletyn Młodego Twórcy" with the poem "Poezja Starego Miasta".

From 1962 to 1985 he was curator of the University Library at the Catholic University of Lublin, from 1977 lecturer for Polish Language and Culture. Since 1978 Michalski Member and in 1986 the board of the Polish Writers' Union. Since 1985 he has been secretary of the literary magazine "Akcent". His texts and reviews published in numerous magazines. In 1995 he was with Bogusław Wróblewski and Bohdan Zadura initiator establishing the East Cultural Foundation "Akcent" and is the secretary.

Waldemar Michalski also published under the pseudonyms WM, Wacław Volynsky Wam, Wami.

Poetry 
 Pejzaż rdzawy, Lublin 1973
 Ogród, Lublin 1977
 Głosy na wersety, Lublin 1979
 Pod znakiem wagi, Lublin 1987
 Będziesz jak piołun. Wybór wierszy, Lublin 1991
 Lekcja wspólnego język, wiersze, Lublin 1999
 Tryptyk z gwiazdą. Wiersze i przekłady. Lublin 2006
 Bariera timpului nu exista. Culegere de poezii, Translation into Romanian by Alexandru G. Serban, Jasi 2012
 Z podróży na Wschód, Toronto 2013

Prizes and awards (selection) 
 Prizes at "Łódzka Wiosna Poetów" (1969, 1971, 1976, 1977)
 Czechowicz Literature Prize, 1968 und 1974
 Literature Prize "Głos Nauczycielski", 1989
 Main Prize at J.-Łobodowski-Literature competition, 1999 
 Zasłużony Działacz Kultury, 1977
 Witold Hulewicz Prize, 2006
 Culture Prize of the Province Lublin, 2007
 Special Prize of the Minister of Culture: „W uznaniu zasług dla Kultury Polskiej”, 2008 
 Srebrna Odznaka Zasłużonemu dla Lublina, 1988 
 Medal Wschodniej Fundacji Kultury Akcent, 1998
 Cross of Merit/Złoty Krzyż Zasługi, 1990 and 2005 
 Medal for Merit to Culture – Gloria Artis/Medal Zasłużony Kulturze Gloria Artis, 2009
 Złoty Wawrzyn Literacki, 2012
 Culture Prize of the City Lublin, 2012

References

External links 
 Lexicon Lublin
  Website of Polish Writers' Union Lublin
 Bibliography 1
 Bibliography 2
 Feature Waldemar Michalski podcast at Allgäuer Milchschleuder-Poesie&FeatureFunk

Polish poets
Polish translators
Recipients of the Gold Cross of Merit (Poland)
Recipients of the Bronze Medal for Merit to Culture – Gloria Artis
Writers from Lublin
People from Volodymyr-Volynskyi
Living people
1938 births
20th-century Polish writers
20th-century Polish male writers